Wendell Phillips Norton Sr. (May 14, 1861 – August 8, 1955) was the inventor of a mechanical gear shift on the Hendy-Norton lathe.

Biography
He was born on May 14, 1861, in Plainville, Connecticut, to John Calvin Norton and Harriet Hotchkiss. He died on August 8, 1955, at his home in Torrington, Connecticut.

References

1861 births
1955 deaths
American inventors
People from Plainville, Connecticut
People from Torrington, Connecticut